Telkom Kenya is an integrated telecommunications provider in Kenya. It was previously a part of the Kenya Posts and Telecommunications Corporation (KPTC) which was the sole provider of both postal and telecommunication services. The company was established as a telecommunications operator in April 1999, after the split of  KPTC into the Communications Commission of Kenya (CCK), the Postal Corporation of Kenya (POSTA) and Telkom Kenya. The company is 60 per cent owned by Helios Investment Partners, with the remaining stake held by the members of the public through the Government of Kenya.

Services
The company operates and maintains the infrastructure over which Kenya's various internet service providers operate. As of 2004, most internet service was provided via dial-up service. Jambonet, an important Kenyan ISP, is a subsidiary of Telkom Kenya. It also offers mobile GSM voice and high speed internet services under the Orange Kenya brand, in which it is the 3rd in market share after Safaricom and Airtel Kenya. In 2018, it was announced that Airtel Kenya was considering a merger with Telkom Kenya. In March 2018, the company resumed a mobile-money service that it had dropped in 2017. Referred to as T-kash, the service is a direct competitor to the M-pesa service, offered by market-leader Safaricom.

History
In 2007 France Télécom (now Orange S.A.) acquired 51% of Telkom Kenya's shares at a cost of US$390 million. In November 2012, the shareholding structure changed due to a decision by the Kenyan government to convert its shareholder loans at that time, into equity in order to ease Telkom Kenya's debt burden. It was subsequently confirmed that the Kenya government would retain 40% shareholding down from 49% with the remaining shares held by France Télécom. In January 2013, France Télécom increased its stake in Telkom Kenya to 70% as a consequence of the government's failure to provide its full portion of the 2012 funding. In June 2017, the firm was re-branded from "Orange Kenya" to "Telkom Kenya".

Past shareholding
On November 9, 2015, Helios Investment Partners announced that they were going to purchase France Télécom's entire stake in Telkom Kenya.

Current shareholding
Subsequent to the agreement to buy, Helios negotiated with the Kenyan government to own 40 percent in the new joint venture, with the investment firm retaining 60 percent. In June 2016, final regulatory approval was received for the deal to proceed. In October 2022, the Kenyan government acquired the remaining 60% of Telkom Kenya from Helios in a $50.4 million USD deal. The current shareholding is as depicted in the table below.

See also
Kenya Internet Exchange

References

External links
 

Telecommunications companies of Kenya
Nairobi
1999 establishments in Kenya
Mobile phone companies of Kenya
Companies established in 1999